Pécsi Női Kosárlabda Klub Sportegyesület (PINKK Pécsi 424,) is a Hungarian women's basketball team, that competes in the top flight of the Hungarian women's basketball leagues. The club is a successor of Bajai NKK (and is officially located in Pécs). The team had to play in Komló between 2012 and 2016, since 2016 they are playing in Pécs.

The club was renamed in 2012 after the cessation of Pécs 2010, the former basketball club in the city.

Current roster
The list of players of PINKK-Pécsi 424 in the 2012/13 season is the following:

References

Women's basketball teams in Hungary
Pécs
Basketball teams established in 2012